Wowk may refer to:

 WOWK-TV, American television station
 Wowk Elementary School, school in British Columbia, Canada
 Brian Wowk, Canadian medical physicist

See also